Speed skating at the 1992 Winter Olympics, was held from 9 to 20 February. Ten events were contested at L'anneau de vitesse. It was the last time in Winter Olympics in which speed skating events were contested in an outdoor ice rink.

Medal summary

Medal table

Germany, in its first Olympics since reunification, topped the medal table with five gold medals, and eleven total medals. All the medals were won by athletes from the former East Germany. Germany's Gunda Niemann led the individual medal table with two golds and a silver, and Norway's Johan Olav Koss was the most successful male skater, with one gold and one silver.

South Korea's Kim Yoon-Man and China's Ye Qiaobo became the first ever medalists for their countries at the Winter Olympics. Bonnie Blair collected two gold medals to become the second most successful female speed skater of the games.

Men's events

Women's events

Records

There were no Olympic or World records set at the 1992 Games, as the outdoor rink in Albertville (as of today the last speed skating outdoor rink in Winter Games history) was not conducive to fast times.

Participating NOCs

Twenty-three nations competed in the speed skating events at Albertville. The Unified Team made its only Olympic appearance.

References

 
1992 Winter Olympics events
1992
1992 in speed skating
Olympics, 1992